Mike Crawford (born October 29, 1974) is a former American football player. He played professionally as a linebacker with of the Miami Dolphins on the National Football League and the Las Vegas Outlaws of the XFL.

High school
Crawford attended George Whittell High School in Zephyr Cove, Nevada. He was named all-conference and all-state honors. His freshman year, he did not make the football team due to his size. He played soccer and was known for his aggressiveness and was asked by the football coaches to join the team next season. His senior year his team won the Nevada state championship. Besides playing football, Crawford played varsity basketball and was a member of the golf team for two years.

College
His freshman year (1993), Crawford was a walk-on for the Nevada Wolf Pack. In 1994, his sophomore year, Crawford saw playing time in 10 games. As a junior in the 1995 season, Crawford was named second-team All Big West with 110 tackles. He recorded 17 tackles against San Diego State. He recorded 111 tackles and was named MVP of the 1996 Las Vegas Bowl.

Pro
Crawford was drafted in the 6th round by the Miami Dolphins in the 1997 NFL Draft. Crawford was cut, re-signed and moved from practice squad to active roster multiple times his rookie year. He appeared in 7 games his rookie season and registered four tackles. He was a member of the Dolphins in 1998 and again become the teammate of former Nevada Wolfpack Quarterback John Dutton, who was drafted in the 1998 NFL Draft. In 2000, Crawford was signed by the Las Vegas Outlaws of the XFL. In the 2001 season he recorded 25 tackles. In 1999 Mike returned to UNR for one semester to receive his bachelor's degree.  In 2001 Mike was picked up by Dennis Greene of the Minnesota Vikings.  Mike played the 2001-2002 season with the Vikings but experienced a career ending injury during the pre-season; he finished the season on the IR list.

Personal
Crawford was known for being a daredevil in his early life. He was notorious for jumping off buildings or cliffs into snowbanks and water features. Even on the day he was drafted by the Dolphins, Crawford allegedly jumped off his mother's roof into a pond due to his excitement. When Crawford was a member of the Dolphins he made a fashion statement with bright Chalk-White dyed hair. According to Crawford and his friends, during a camping trip near Lake Tahoe, he had an interaction where he wrestled a bear.

References

External links
 Las Vegas Outlaws profile
 

1974 births
Living people
American football linebackers
Las Vegas Outlaws (XFL) players
Miami Dolphins players
Nevada Wolf Pack football players
People from Douglas County, Nevada
Sportspeople from Reno, Nevada
Players of American football from Nevada